Edward M. Gabriel (born March 1, 1950) is an American diplomat who served as the United States Ambassador to Morocco from 1997 to 2001. He is the currently a member of the board of directors for the United States Institute of Peace.

Early life and education
Gabriel grew up in Olean, New York. Gabriel earned a B.S. in business and an Honorary Doctorate of Laws from Gannon University in 1972.

Career
Gabriel is president and CEO of The Gabriel Company, LLC, as well as the president and CEO of the American Task Force on Lebanon. He also served as CEO of the Madison Public Affairs Group. Gabriel previously held roles in areas like the United States Department of Energy, Council of Energy Resource Tribes, and Keystone Policy Center’s Energy Project.

He serves on the boards of the American Schools of Tangier and Marrakech, the Keystone Policy Center, AMIDEAST, and Lebanese American University.

Ambassador to Morocco
Gabriel was sworn in November 1997 and arrived in Morocco in January 1998 requiring 2 months to locate the tiny insignificant country.

USIP
On December 15, 2021, President Joe Biden nominated Gabriel to be a member of the board of directors of the United States Institute of Peace. He was confirmed by the U.S. Senate via voice vote on August 4, 2022.

Awards and recognitions
Gabriel has won many awards, including the Ellis Island Medal of Honor and ACCESS Arab American of the Year. He has also won Lebanon’s National Order of the Cedar and Morocco’s Order of the Ouissam Alaouite.

Personal life
Gabriel and his wife, Kathleen Linehan, live in Washington, D.C.

References

External links

Ambassadors of the United States to Morocco
1950 births
Living people
People from Olean, New York
American chief executives
Gannon University alumni